Peachtree Hills is a neighborhood within the Buckhead district of Atlanta, Georgia. It primarily contains residential buildings, however, commercial buildings are scattered throughout the neighborhood.  Peachtree Battle Shopping Center is located within the borders of Peachtree Hills.

Geography
Peachtree Hills' geographical borders are Peachtree Road on the west, Lindbergh Drive on the north, Amtrak/freight rail lines on the east, and Peachtree Creek on the south.  Other neighborhoods that border Peachtree Hills include: Peachtree Battle Alliance, Peachtree Heights West, Peachtree Heights East, Garden Hills, Lindbergh/Morosgo, and Armour.

History

The Civil War Battle of Peachtree Creek took place very close to present day Peachtree Hills.

Peachtree Hills was subdivided from farmland in 1910.  It was originally a streetcar suburb of Atlanta in the early 20th century.

Transportation
Peachtree Hills is in close proximity to Peachtree Road, I-85, I-75, S.R. 400, and the Buford Highway Connector.

Hartsfield–Jackson Atlanta International Airport is approximately 15 miles south of the neighborhood.

Peachtree Hills is within walking distance of the Lindbergh Center station, which provides access to MARTA's Red and Gold rapid transit lines, as well as select bus routes. Lindbergh Center station provides Peachtree Hills residents with direct, convenient, and economical access to the Hartsfield–Jackson Atlanta International Airport through the MARTA Red and Gold rapid transit lines.

Construction on the Clifton Corridor is expected to begin in 2022. The Clifton Corridor will be a boon to residents of Peachtree Hills. Light rail is expected to run from Lindbergh Center station to Avondale station and provide Peachtree Hills residents with convenient access to Emory University and Your DeKalb Farmers Market.

The Atlanta Beltline northside trail will eventually run near Peachtree Hills, bringing light-rail and easier access to Lindbergh Center station and Armour to the south.

Education
Residents of Peachtree Hills live in the Rivers Elementary, Sutton Middle, and North Atlanta High public school districts.

The following private schools are located near Peachtree Hills:

 Christ the King School (K-8)
 Atlanta International School (PK-12)
 Dar Un-Noor School (PK-8)
 Heritage Preparatory School (PK-8)
 Midtown International School (K-8)
 Atlanta Montessori International School (PK-9)
 Immaculate Heart of Mary Catholic School (K-8)
 Torah Day School of Atlanta (K-8)
 Yeshiva Ohr Yisrael of Atlanta (9-12)
 The Richard and Jean Katz High School for Girls (9-12) 
 Ben Franklin Academy (9-12)

Residents of Peachtree Hills also enjoy close proximity to the many colleges and universities in the Atlanta metropolitan area.

Amenities
The following amenities are located within the borders of Peachtree Hills:

 Gas/Convenience
 Chevron (open 24 hours)
 Grocery
 Publix Super Market
 Public
 Peachtree Hills Park, a public park hosting tennis courts, a playground, community gardens, picnic tables, and a softball field.
 Peachtree Hills Recreation Center
 Restaurants
 Another Broken Egg Cafe
 Baskin-Robbins
 Cafe Lapin
 J. Christopher's
 Jalisco Restaurant
 KR SteakBar
 Maki Fresh
 Pasta Vino
 Starbucks
 Treehouse Restaurant and Pub
 Veda Juice
 Whitehall Tavern
 Zoes Kitchen
 Shopping
 Ace Hardware
 Acoustech Music Productions
 Atlanta Decorative Arts Center (ADAC)
 Design Galleria Kitchen and Bath Studio
 Peachtree Hills Cleaners
 pH Wine Merchant
 South of Market
 The European Collection
 Duralee Fabrics
 Lumiere
 Galleries at Peachtree Hills
 Mrs. Howard
 Robuck
 Jacqueline Adams Antiques
 Parish Kohanim Photography
 FORME Studios
 Tracyb Hair Studio
 Witzlib Training
 GNC
 Nadeau - Furniture with a Soul
 Holeman & Finch Bottle Shop
 Gramercy Home
 Richards Variety Store
 Rite Aid
 Carter's
 OshKosh B'gosh
 J. McLaughlin
 LaRo Jewelers
 EcoHome Fine Gifts & Home Decor
 Natural Body Spa and Shop
 Chico's
 The Childrens Shop
 Cabe and Cato
 Nail Shadow
 Junko Hair Studio
 Club Pilates
 Talbots
 Buckhead Wright's Florist
 Peachtree Battle Antiques & Interiors

References

External links
Peachtree Hills Civic Association
History of Peachtree Road area, Buckhead.net

Neighborhoods in Atlanta